The Edekabank AG is a universal bank and a business of the Edeka Group located at the Edeka House, New-York-Ring 6 in the City Nord in Hamburg.
The bank is the central financing institute of the Edeka grocery retailers and is active in consumer banking as direct bank with online and phone consulting.

Business
The Edekabank was founded on 9 November 1914 in Berlin to secure access to the equity market for all cooperative members of the Edeka-combine even in the crisis of World War I. Still today the funding of Edeka-retailers and setting up businesses in the Edeka-combine is the bank's core business.

The Edekabank is a member of the German Cooperative Financial Group.

As of December 31, 2020, with total assets of around 3.7 billion Euro, the Edekabank belongs to the biggest 100 credit institutions in the cooperative banking union.

The Edekabank-Group consists of the parent company Edekabank AG and the subsidiary Edeka Versicherungsdienst Vermittlungs-GmbH as well as the Edeka Leasing GmbH (now LGH Leasinggesellschaft für den Handel mbH) until it was sold to Albis Leasing AG on October 1, 2015.

The Edekabank exists in the legal form of an incorporated company. Its stocks are registered shares with restricted transferability, which are not being traded at the stock exchange. Shareholders are the Edeka-Cooperatives (50,2 %), Edeka Zentrale AG & Co. KG (41,4 %) and the DZ Bank AG (8,4 %).

Business activity

Wholesale banking
The Edekabank services include payment transactions, cash supply and disposal, business accounts, investment loans, working fund loans and entrepreneur loans as well as financial consulting and intermediation of public funds. The Edekabank brokers industry insurances and company legal costs insurances as well as private risk coverage for entrepreneurs via its subsidiary Edeka Versicherungsdienst Vermittlungs-GmbH.

Via the Edeka Leasing GmbH, the Edekabank offered leading models for trade specific goods such as cash systems or cooling systems right up to complete store fittings.

Consumer banking
Private customers of the Edekabank are mostly looked after via internet or phone. In the Hamburg headquarter one branch with counter hall and consulting rooms operated until its closure on November 18, 2016. In the course of the branch closing the safe deposit locker system was changed to into a self-service unit. 

In the bank's portfolio holds all usual services and products in the areas of payment transaction, financial investments and financing. The Edekabank offers a free of charge check account (Edeka-Konto) with a kickback of 1% on purchases made in Edeka grocery stores (up to max. of 50 Euros per year). For the company's 100-year jubilee in 2014, the Edekabank raised the kickback to 2% (up to max. 100 Euros per year). Customers of the Edekabank have access to free cash withdrawal at the over 19000 ATMs of the cooperative Bankcard-Servicenetz. Included are also the bank's own 46 ATMs in some of the bigger Edeka grocery stores. 

Private customers receive various insurance products via the subsidiary Edeka Versicherungsdienst Vermittlungs-GmbH.

Business locations
The business area of the Edekabank extends to all of Germany. For the customer service, the bank sectioned its business area in three regions. The independent retailers in those regions are being looked after by mobile business customer consultants.

Technology
The Edekabank AG is affiliated to the cooperative data center of the Fiducia & GAD IT AG located in Frankfurt and uses the data center’s software bank21 as core banking system.

References

External links
 Official Website
 Edeka Versicherungsdienst Vermittlungs-GmbH Website

Banks of Germany
Cooperative banks of Germany
Corporate finance
1914 establishments